The College of Education, Billiri also known as COE Billiri is a state government higher education institution located in Billiri, Gombe State, Nigeria. The current provost is Langa Hassan.

History 
The College of Education, Billiri was established in 2012.

Courses 
The institution offers the following courses:

 Christian Religious Studies
 Integrated Science and Education
 Economics
 Computer Science Education
 History
 Biology Education
 Education and Mathematics
 Political Science
 Primary Education Studies
 Special Education
 Arabic
 Education and French
 Early Childhood Care Education
 Education and English
 Social Studies
 Cultural and Creative Art
 Islamic Studies
 Hausa
 Education and Geography

References 

2012 establishments in Nigeria
Educational institutions established in 2012
Universities and colleges in Nigeria